Sigrid Burton is an American painter, long based in New York City, whose semi-abstract work is known for its use of expressive, atmospheric color fields and enigmatic allusions to natural and cultural realms. Writers most frequently align her work with artists such as J.M.W. Turner, Odilon Redon, Pierre Bonnard and Mark Rothko, as well as the light of her native California. Art & Antiques describes her approach as "chromatic expressionism," with color serving as "her undisputed protagonist"; Peter Frank observes, "The dialectic between color and form has always inflected, even impelled" Burton's painting, with color the more omnipresent element, and form the more persistent.  While largely abstract, her work has consistently referenced natural phenomena. Art historian William C. Agee writes, "The domains she explores […] meet, intersect, fuse, and then disappear, like apparitions, in liquid pools of mist and color. Her pictorial odyssey refers simultaneously to both a higher order, a timeless cosmic vastness, as well as to a private, interior world, abounding in personal histories and memories."

Burton has had solo exhibitions in New York City, Los Angeles, San Francisco, Chicago and Osaka, including at Artists Space and the Michael C. Rockefeller Arts Center, and been included in shows at A.I.R. Gallery, the John and Mable Ringling Museum of Art, and the Carnegie Art Museum, Oxnard. Her work belongs to the public collections of the Metropolitan Museum of Art, Rockefeller Foundation, and Palm Springs Desert Museum, and has been reviewed in Arts Magazine, Artillery, Arts & Antiques, Jung Journal, Chicago Tribune and LA Weekly. She has lived and worked in Pasadena, California since 2013.

Life and career
Burton was born in Pasadena, California to Gene and Betye (Monell) Burton, both enthusiastic art patrons. She went to Westridge School for Girls (1963–9), where performance artist Barbara T. Smith was a teacher and mentor; Burton assisted her on the well-known performance, Ritual Meal (1969), and participated in Allan Kaprow's Fluids (1967). After attending the University of California, Berkeley, she completed a BA degree (1973) at Bennington College, Vermont, studying with Pat Adams, Carol Haerer and Sidney Tillim. Burton moved to New York City to work as a studio assistant to painter Helen Frankenthaler, and subsequently, Jules Olitski; she assisted Frankenthaler on the painted-tile series, Thanksgiving Day (1973), exhibited at the Guggenheim Museum. During that time she began exhibiting professionally, in group shows at the American Academy of Arts and Letters and solo exhibitions at Artists Space (1976) and Salander O'Reilly (1980) in New York, Martha White (Louisville, 1982–4), Ivory Kimpton (San Francisco, 1984–7), Patricia Hamilton Gallery (New York and Santa Monica, 1986–90) and Hokin Kaufman (Chicago, 1987–90), among others.

Travel—to Italy, China and India, among many places—has been a key source of inspiration and evolution in Burton's work. In 1994, she was awarded an Indo-American Senior Research Fellowship from the Fulbright Program to study the meaning and use of color in traditional Indian art and ritual forms. She followed with postgraduate work in the South Asian Studies at Columbia University in New York City (1996–9). Burton's work has been used for covers for Janice Moore Fuller's book of poems, Sex Education and The Poetry Project, and appeared in The New York Times, Architectural Digest, Interior Design, and House Beautiful, hanging in featured homes of collectors.

In addition to her art career, Burton has taught for and served on the Board of Directors for LEAP (Learning through an Expanded Arts Program) in the New York City school system, volunteered and wrote a manual for AIDS service organizations, and been appointed to the Manhattan Community Board 2 (2007-2012). In 2013, she returned to Pasadena with her husband, Max Brennan, where she serves on the Board of Trustees for the Westridge School.

Work
Burton has written that light and landscape, travel, antecedents in Western painting, and Indian art have been key inspirations for her work. She draws literally and figuratively from the natural world of botanical, biological and weather phenomena, the structures of macro and micro cosmologies, and systems such as writing. Her range of influences includes Buddhist cave and Indian miniature paintings, Jain cosmological diagrams, and artists from the Renaissance to modernists (Kandinsky, Klee and the Color field painters) to the California Light and Space movement. William C. Agee wrote, "these references reveal themselves slowly, giving her art a sense of duration, a sense of a long journey through space, time, and memory," as if one "were moving between worlds, cultures, and centuries," as well as physical or spiritual states of creation and dissolution. Color, in particular, has been a foundation of her practice, from the early influence of Kandinsky's work and conception of the transcendent power of abstract art to her later studies of Indian aesthetic theories.

Early Painting (1973–1995)
Burton's early acrylic paintings of the 1970s, featuring broad swaths and pooled abstract color, were indebted to Color field painting and traditions running through Rothko, Matisse and Impressionism, back to Titian. By the late 1970s, however, she felt constrained by the remoteness of formalism and looked to artists who merged abstraction with direct or referential imagery, such as Lois Lane and Terry Winters. Rethinking her working method, she switched to oil paint (for its greater textural and chromatic qualities), worked upright using brushes (for greater control) on stretched canvasses rather than on the floor, and incorporated drawing that broadly referenced recognizable, more personal content. Chicago Tribune critic Alan Artner called the new work "promising" and "lyrical," noting that its linear, gestural elements and areas of thick paint departed from Frankenthaler's work, while the color and feeling evoked Burton's California roots. The Louisville Courier Journal described the work as active and exuberant, with "a varied and resourceful color vocabulary" and fleeting hints of landscape.

After an art residency at the Bellagio Study Center in Italy in 1985, Burton experimented with painted borders and frames within the picture plane, as well as abstracted biomorphic elements, color, and light derived from observed nature and landscape studies. Arts Magazine critic Tony Towle wrote that her "large, lush and colorful" oils had a richness suggesting pastels; calling them "mysteriously semi-abstract," he contrasted Burton's increased figuration—suggesting "timeless, overgrown gardens" (notably in the diptych Notes from an Italian Journal (for Gene and Betye))—with her vigorous brushwork, high-key palette, and multi-colored borders, which heightened an opposing sense of ambiguity and unreality. Towle likened the work to that of Arshile Gorky—without his torment—calling the result "a tranquil, dreamlike landscape" that felt primeval yet lacked menace.” Burton worked in this semi-abstract fashion into the 1990s, often alluding to landscapes and objects from her ongoing travels.

Mature Painting (1995– )
After an extended stay in India in 1995, during a time of personal loss as well as the AIDS crisis, Burton again re-evaluated her art and its ability to express the totality of experience. She emerged with darker, brooding works (frequently in reds and deep crimsons, such as The Waters of March, 1999) more rooted to everyday experience and memory, and rich in natural and multicultural allusions that appeared and dispersed amid hazy, color-saturated surfaces. Often, this work used implicit grids and loosely constructed, imagined or canonical Indian color systems as a starting point. Critics described her approach as intentional yet ambiguous, and mysterious with a "calculated inexactitude" that obscured distinctions between figure and ground, plant and animal. In 1999, Peter Frank observed, "form asserts itself in the midst of her luminous, translucent clouds of color, giving unanticipated backbone to otherwise invertebrate masses of hue and tone." William Agee noted how Burton's expansive, atmospheric spaces are "brought back to earth by passages of drawing" that allude to quotidian life and world culture; he compared her fusion of these pictorial opposites to that of Matisse.

In 2001, the pharmaceutical firm, Merck & Company, commissioned Burton to create a suite of site-specific paintings for the concourse of its global headquarters in Whitehouse Station, New Jersey; the colorful installation represented her first permanent environment of works in direct dialogue with one another. Throughout the 2000s, Burton has continued to work in modulated monochrome fields with sparse organic forms, blurring the line between image and pure abstraction. Reviewing a 2005 exhibition, Peter Frank wrote, Burton's "canvasses enfold the eye in baths of light and color," depicting "some half-remembered, half-imagined experience, a dream so aqueous, it might have been dreamt in the womb.”

In the 2010s, Burton's paintings  have been increasingly informed by her own astronomical observations at observatories in Pasadena and Chile, as well as longstanding natural, calligraphic, Hindu and Jain motifs. These paintings are more abstract than previous work, with greater depth of field and dense layering; reviews characterize them by their acrobatic visual play between rich, mysterious color fields and loose, unfettered mark-making, whose elements suggest responses to natural phenomena and personal experience rather than representations, as in Asterisms (above), Storm Heart or The Angle of a Landscape (all 2019). Writing about the work (from 2015–9) in Burton's 2020 show at Tufenkian Gallery, critic and curator Michael Duncan describes Burton as exploring "paint’s ideal potential in an unapologetic pursuit of the sublime," part of a neglected underground of colorists using "color as a vehicle to the ineffable."

Works on paper
While best known for her painting, Burton has throughout her career created mixed-media works on paper that recall Kurt Schwitters and Paul Klee and use pencils, pastels, oil sticks and collage. Her later works on paper, such as Maroc (2013–6), repurpose old drawings and accumulated ephemera from Burton's travels and from scrapbooks of her grandparents; the choice of collaged material is often intentionally but cryptically biographical or autobiographical. These later drawings explore a deeper sense of space and figure-ground ambiguity which has crossed over to her paintings.

Collections and awards
Burton's work is included in numerous corporate, private and public collections, including those of the Metropolitan Museum of Art, Rockefeller Foundation, John & Mable Ringling Museum of Art, Palm Springs Desert Museum, Mullin Automotive Museum, Bucknell University, and Lewis and Clark College, among others. She has received commissions from Merck & Company (2001), Georgetown Plaza, New York (1990), and the Glick Organization (1986). Burton has been recognized with a Fulbright Indo-American Senior Research Fellowship (1994-1995), a Rockefeller Foundation Arts Residency at the Bellagio Study Center in Italy (1985), and a Rosenthal Family Foundation Award through the American Academy of Arts and Letters (1977). She has been a visiting artist at Delhi College of Art, the Chautauqua Institution, and Virginia Tech. In 2019, Burton was recognized by the Westridge School as its 2019 Mary Lowther Ranney Distinguished Alumna Award recipient.

References

External links
Sigrid Burton official website
Sigrid Burton, Tufenkian Fine Arts
Sigrid Burton, Amy Simon Fine Art

20th-century American painters
21st-century American painters
American abstract artists
Bennington College alumni
People from Pasadena, California
1951 births
Living people
20th-century American women artists
21st-century American women artists